Edward Norris may refer to:

 Edward Norris (1911–2002), American actor
 Edward T. Norris (born 1960), American radio host, former law enforcement officer in Maryland
 Edward Samuel Norris (1832–1908), English politician
 Slim Norris (Edward Fairbanks Norris, 1907–1931), American baseball player
 Sir Edward Norreys (died 1603), or Norris, governor of Ostend